A virtual community is an online social network.

It may also refer to:
 Online community, whose members interact with each other primarily via the Internet
 Virtual community of practice, a community of practice that is maintained online
 The Virtual Community, a 1993 book by Howard Rheingold
 Virtual business, which employs electronic means to transact business
 Virtual reality, a simulated experience
 Virtual scientific community, a group of scientists who share resources over the internet
 Virtual team, individuals who work together from different geographic locations
 Virtual world, a computer-simulated environment

See also

 
 
 List of virtual communities
 List of virtual communities with more than 1 million users
 IBM Virtual Universe Community
 
 Virtual (disambiguation)
 Community (disambiguation)